Szepesi mis a Hungarian surname. Notable people with the surname include: 

Ádám Szepesi, Hungarian high jumper
Gusztáv Szepesi, Hungarian football defender
György Szepesi-Friedländer, Hungarian radio personality and sports executive
István Szepesi
Ivett Szepesi
Kálmán Szepesi
Nikolett Szepesi, Hungarian swimmer
Ottmár Szepesi

Hungarian-language surnames